Aysapay is a rural locality (a settlement) in Seitovsky Selsoviet, Krasnoyarsky District, Astrakhan Oblast, Russia. The population was 37 as of 2010. There are 3 streets.

Geography 
Aysapay is located 45 km northwest of Krasny Yar (the district's administrative centre) by road. Kuyanly is the nearest rural locality.

References 

Rural localities in Krasnoyarsky District, Astrakhan Oblast